The National Roofing Contractors Association is one of the US construction industry's trade associations and a voice in the roofing industry for information, education, technology, and advocacy. Founded in 1886, the NRCA is a nonprofit association that represents all segments of the roofing industry, including contractors; manufacturers; distributors; architects; consultants; engineers; building owners; and city, state, and government agencies. "The association has more than 3,500 members from all 50 states and 53 countries and is affiliated with 97 local, state, regional and international roofing contractor associations”

Professional Roofing is NRCA's monthly publication. Reid Ribble is the current Chief Executive Officer.

References

External links 

Trade associations based in the United States